Beryl is an unincorporated community in west-central Iron County, Utah, United States.

Description

The community has one school, Escalante Valley Elementary, and it is part of the Iron County School District. Originally established as a Union Pacific Railroad siding, Beryl was named in 1901 after the semi-precious stone beryl found in the area.

The 2012 Beryl (ZIP 84714), population is 944. There are 2 people per square mile (population density).
The median age is 31.6. The US median is 37.3. 57.63% of people in Beryl are married. 9.86% are divorced.
The average household size is 3.13 people. 40.54% of people are married, with children. 6.31% have children, but are single.

Climate
According to the Köppen Climate Classification system, Beryl has a semi-arid climate, abbreviated "BSk" on climate maps.

See also

References

External links

Unincorporated communities in Iron County, Utah
Unincorporated communities in Utah